Petre Ceapura (born 12 July 1942) is a retired Romanian rower. He competed at the 1968, 1972 and 1980 Olympics in the coxed fours (1968) and coxed pairs (1972 and 1980) and won a bronze medal in 1972, placing fourth in 1980. In 1970 he became the first world champion in rowing from Romania. He also won three bronze medals at the European championships in 1967–1973. After retiring from competitions he worked as a coach at his club Dinamo București.

References

References

External links
 

1942 births
Living people
Romanian male rowers
Olympic rowers of Romania
Rowers at the 1968 Summer Olympics
Rowers at the 1972 Summer Olympics
Rowers at the 1980 Summer Olympics
Olympic bronze medalists for Romania
Olympic medalists in rowing
World Rowing Championships medalists for Romania
Medalists at the 1972 Summer Olympics
European Rowing Championships medalists